Willemina is a Dutch feminine given name similar to Wilhelmina. Bearers often use a short form in daily life, including  Ineke, Mien, Miep, Wil, Will, Willeke, Willy, and Wilma. People with the name include:

Willemina Jacoba "Wil" van Gogh (1862–1941), Dutch nurse and early feminist, sister of Vincent van Gogh
Willemina C.A. "Wilma" van Hofwegen (born 1971), Dutch swimmer
Willemina "Will" van Kralingen (1951–2012), Dutch actress 
Willemina Ogterop (1881–1974), Dutch-born American stained glass window designer
Willemina R.C. "Mirjam" Sterk (born 1973), Dutch politician and educator 
Willemina Hendrika "Ineke" Tigelaar (born 1945), Dutch swimmer
Willemina Zwanida "Willeke" Wendrich (born 1961), Dutch-born American Egyptologist and archaeologist

Dutch feminine given names